1,1-Dihydroxyethene is an organic compound consisting of two hydroxy groups as substituents on the same carbon atom of an ethene chain. The chemical is also called ketene hydrate because it is the carbonyl hydrate of ketene. Its structure can also be considered as the enol form of acetic acid. This compound is likely a key intermediate in the hydration reaction that converts ketene into acetic acid. The analysis of the possible pathways for this reaction has been cited as an example of the importance of considering activation energy of each mechanistic step. The hydration of the carbonyl of ketene, which formally involves an addition reaction of one water molecule onto the carbonyl group, is likely catalyzed by a second water molecule. The compound has now been synthesized and identified spectroscopically.

References 

Enols
Geminal diols